Stephen Leron Nicholas (born May 1, 1983) is an American football coach and former linebacker who is the defensive quality control coach for the Tampa Bay Buccaneers of the National Football League (NFL). He was drafted by the Atlanta Falcons in the fourth round of the 2007 NFL Draft and played for the team for seven seasons. He played college football at South Florida.

Early years
Nicholas played high school football at Robert E. Lee High School in Jacksonville, Florida. As a senior, he was a class 3A all-state linebacker and was invited to play in the Shrine Bowl.

Playing career

College

Nicholas played college football at the University of South Florida. During his senior year, he was a Big East first-team selection. He finished his college career with 326 tackles, 20 sacks, and a school record 53.5 tackles for loss.

National Football League

Atlanta Falcons
Nicholas was drafted by the Atlanta Falcons in the fourth round of the 2007 NFL Draft. He finished his rookie year with 37 tackles and one sack. In 2008, he saw action in all 16 games during the season. In 2009, he started 14 games, totaling 82 tackles, 3 sacks. He started his first career game against Miami on September 13. Nicholas was released by the Falcons after seven seasons on February 5, 2014.

Coaching career

Tampa Bay Buccaneers
In 2018, Nicholas was hired by the Tampa Bay Buccaneers to be their defensive quality control coach.

Personal life

Stephen Nicholas married then Irene Ledbetter (2007) and have 4 children.  Nicholas is also a member of Omega Psi Phi fraternity.

References

External links
Atlanta Falcons bio
USF Bulls bio

1983 births
Living people
Players of American football from Jacksonville, Florida
American football linebackers
South Florida Bulls football players
Robert E. Lee High School (Jacksonville) alumni
Atlanta Falcons players